Gjende or Gjendin is a lake in Vågå Municipality in Innlandet county, Norway. It is located in the Jotunheimen mountain range and also inside Jotunheimen National Park. The proglacial lake shows typical characteristics of glacial formation, being long and narrow, with steep walls. Gjende has a characteristic light-green color resulting from the large quantity of rock flour which is discharged into the Gjende by the Muru river. The river Sjoa provides the outlet from Gjende at Gjendesheim, and flows eastward into the Gudbrandsdalslågen river.

There are numerous staffed tourist cabins maintained by the Norwegian Mountain Touring Association (DNT); in the west end lies Gjendebu, on the north side lies Memurubu and on the east end lies Gjendesheim. In the summer boats provide transport between these locations.

Name
The name is derived from Norse gandr which means 'staff' or 'stick'. This is referring to the form of the long and narrow lake.

The official name Gjende is taken from the Gudbrandsdal traditional district dialect used in Lom and Vågå. In the Vang dialect the lake is called Gjendin, which is the form you find in Henrik Ibsen's name for what is now called Besseggen, formerly Gjendineggen, or Gendineggen in the older orthography. The name Gjende is derived from the old Norse word "gandir" that can be translated into "straight stick", whereas the lake to the south Bygdin can be translated as "bent stick", the two names thereby referring to the shape of the lakes.

The lake gave its name to a famous early outdoors man and free thinker, Jo Gjende (1794—1884), who had a cabin at Gjende.

Cultural and literary references
Lake Gjende is found in literature and travel books from the 18th century. Together, the Jotunheimen lakes of Gjende and Bygdin play in many such descriptions. For example, Henrik Ibsen's Peer Gynt took his famous wild-reindeer ride along "the Gjendin Ridge", a reference to either the narrow Besseggen Ridge - or the Knutshø ridge on the other side of lake Gjende.

Media gallery

See also
List of lakes in Norway

References

External links 

Lake depth map of Gjende (Norwegian)
Gjendebåtane - "To the heart of Jotunheimen by boat"
Gjendesheim
Gjendebu
Memurubu (Norwegian only)

Vågå
Jotunheimen
Lakes of Innlandet